Art Institute of Seattle may refer to:

The Art Institute of Seattle, a for-profit institution offering associate and bachelor's degrees in various fields, which took that name in 1982
The institution formed in 1917 by the merger of the Seattle Fine Arts Society and the Washington Arts Association, which donated its collection to the Seattle Art Museum in 1933.

Universities and colleges accredited by the Northwest Commission on Colleges and Universities